Aulodrilus is a genus of annelids belonging to the family Naididae.

Species:
 Aulodrilus americanus Brinkhurst & Cook, 1966 
 Aulodrilus limnobius Bretscher, 1899

References

Naididae